Dysmathosoma is a genus of beetles in the family Cerambycidae, containing the following species:

 Dysmathosoma lucidus Vives, 2004
 Dysmathosoma picipes Waterhouse, 1882

References

Dorcasominae